This list does not contain the Grade I listed churches, or the Grade I listed buildings in the city of Chester.  For these see Grade I listed churches in Cheshire and Grade I listed buildings in Chester.

The Grade I listed buildings in Cheshire, excluding those in the city of Chester, total around 80.  Almost half of these are churches that are contained in a separate list.

Most Cheshire buildings are in sandstone, brick or are timber framed.  Limestone is used for some buildings in the east of the county.  Compared with other counties, timber framing is important.  Cheshire has a higher proportion of timber-framed houses than most other English counties.

Buildings

See also

Scheduled Monuments in Cheshire (pre-1066)

References
Citations

Sources